“The”Excelsior High School is a co-educational high school for boys and girls between the ages of 11 and 20. It was first established in 1931 in Campbell Town and is now located in Kingston, Jamaica.

The school program includes academics, sports, and performing arts. Students who have gone on to become artists include Louise Bennett Coverly and Konshens. Students who have gone on to become professional sportsmen include the cricketers Courtney Walsh who was selected for the Jamaica national cricket team straight out of school, and Chris Gayle. The school is known for winning the Manning and Walker Cup more than once, and beating St George's College..

Other notable past Excelsorians include Cliff Hughes (OD), Owen "Blakka" Ellis, Claudette Pious, Hon. A. J. Nicholson, Hon. Phillip Paulwell and Hope Arthurine Anderson.

The school has a "green" program facilitated by a group of students in an environmental club who recycle plastic bottles and paper, interact with the agricultural science programme, plant and maintain grass and plants on the school grounds, and maintain a greenhouse.

References

External links
 Excelsior High School Alumni Association

High schools in Jamaica
Schools in Kingston, Jamaica
Educational institutions established in 1931
1930s establishments in Jamaica